The Twelfth Federal Electoral District of the Federal District (XII Distrito Electoral Federal del Distrito Federal) is one of the 300 Electoral Districts into which Mexico is divided for the purpose of elections to the federal Chamber of Deputies and one of 27 such districts in the Federal District ("DF" or Mexico City).

It elects one deputy to the lower house of Congress for each three-year legislative period, by means of the first past the post system.

District territory
Under the 2005 districting scheme, the DF's Twelfth District covers that portion of the borough (delegación) of Cuauhtémoc to the south and east of  Paseo de la Reforma and Calzada de Guadalupe; it thus covers Mexico City's Centro Histórico.

Previous districting schemes

1996–2005 district
Between 1996 and 2005, the Twelfth District covered the southern and western portions of Cuauhtémoc.

Deputies returned to Congress from this district

L Legislature
 1976–1979: Miguel López Riveroll (PRI)
LI Legislature
 1979–1982: Roberto Castellano Tovar (PRI)
LII Legislature
 1982–1985: Wulfrano Leyva Salas (PRI)
LIII Legislature
 1985–1988:
LIV Legislature
 1988–1991:
LV Legislature
 1991–1994:
LVI Legislature
 1994–1997: José Noe Moreno Carvajal (PRI)
LVII Legislature
 1997–2000:
LVIII Legislature
 2000–2003: Samuel Yoselevitz Fraustro (PAN)
LIX Legislature
 2003–2006: Francisco Javier Saucedo (PRD)
LX Legislature
 2006–2009: José Alfonso Suárez del Real (PRD)

References and notes

Federal electoral districts of Mexico
Mexico City